Morpho achilles, the Achilles morpho, blue-banded morpho, or banded blue morpho, is a Neotropical butterfly.

Etymology
The genus name Morpho comes from the Greek epithet of Aphrodite, goddess of love. Achilles was a Greek hero of the Trojan War, the central character of Homer's Iliad.

Description
In Morpho achilles patroclus, the dorsal sides of the forewings are black, with two broad vertical bands of brilliant blue. The undersides of the hindwings are olive brownish, with several ocelli formed by blue, yellow, and red concentric rings.

Subspecies
M. a. achilles (Linnaeus, 1758) – Brazil, Suriname, and Guyana
M. a. agamedes Fruhstorfer, 1912 – Peru
M. a. fischeri Weber, 1962 – Peru
M. a. glaisi Le Moult & Réal, 1962 – Venezuela
M. a. guaraunos Le Moult, 1925 – Venezuela
M. a. guerrerensis Le Moult & Réal, 1962
M. a. patroclus C. & R. Felder, 1861 – Colombia
M. a. phokylides Fruhstorfer, 1912 – Venezuela, Colombia, Ecuador, Bolivia, Peru, and Brazil
M. a. theodorus Fruhstorfer, 1907 – Ecuador
M. a. vitrea Butler, 1866 – Bolivia

Biology
The caterpillars feed on various species of climbing plants (Dalbergia, Inga, Machaerium, Machaerium aculeatum, Myrocarpus, Platymiscium, and Pterocarpus), while the adults mainly feed on rotting fruits or fermenting juice and tree sap.

Distribution
This species can be found over a huge range of countries, particularly in Argentina, Suriname, Bolivia, Colombia, Peru, Ecuador, Venezuela, Paraguay, and Brazil.

Gallery

See also
 Tropical Andes

References
Le Moult (E.) & Réal (P.), 1962-1963. Les Morpho d'Amérique du Sud et Centrale, Editions du cabinet entomologique E. Le Moult, Paris.
Paul Smart, 1976 The Illustrated Encyclopedia of the Butterfly World in Color. London, Salamander: Encyclopedie des papillons. Lausanne, Elsevier Sequoia (French language edition)   page 236 fig. 5 as patroclus ssp. orestes Weber, underside (Peru), page 237 fig. 9 (Brazil), page 237 fig. 12 as patroclus ssp. orestes Weber, upperside (Peru).

External links

Butterflies of America Images of type and other specimens
NRM Holotype of Morpho achilles roqueensis Bryk, 1953.
"Morpho Fabricius, 1807" at Markku Savela's Lepidoptera and Some Other Life Forms
Blue Banded Morpho

Morpho
Nymphalidae of South America
Butterflies described in 1758
Fauna of Brazil
Taxa named by Carl Linnaeus